A mongoose is a small terrestrial carnivorous mammal belonging to the family Herpestidae. This family is currently split into two subfamilies, the Herpestinae and the Mungotinae. The Herpestinae comprises 23 living species that are native to southern Europe, Africa and Asia, whereas the Mungotinae comprises 11 species native to Africa.

Etymology
The English word "mongoose" used to be spelled "mungoose" in the 18th and 19th centuries. The name is derived from names used in India for Herpestes species: 
 in Marathi;
 in Telugu;

The form of the English name (since 1698) was altered to its "-goose" ending by folk etymology. The plural form is "mongooses".

Characteristics
Mongooses have long faces and bodies, small, rounded ears, short legs, and long, tapering tails. Most are brindled or grizzly; a few have strongly marked coats which bear a striking resemblance to mustelids. Their nonretractile claws are used primarily for digging. Mongooses, much like goats, have narrow, ovular pupils. Most species have a large anal scent gland, used for territorial marking and signaling reproductive status.

Mongooses are one of at least four known mammalian taxa with mutations in the nicotinic acetylcholine receptor that protect against snake venom. Their modified receptors prevent the snake venom α-neurotoxin from binding. These represent four separate, independent mutations. In the mongoose, this change is effected, uniquely, by glycosylation.

Taxonomy
Herpestina was a scientific name proposed by Charles Lucien Bonaparte in 1845 who considered the mongooses a subfamily of the Viverridae. In 1864, John Edward Gray classified the mongooses into three subfamilies: Galidiinae, Herpestinae and Mungotinae. This grouping was supported by Reginald Innes Pocock in 1919, who referred to the family as "Mungotidae".

Genetic research based on nuclear and mitochondrial DNA analyses revealed that the Galidiinae are more closely related to Madagascar carnivores, including the fossa and Malagasy civet. Galidiinae is presently considered a subfamily of Eupleridae.

Phylogenetic relationships
Phylogenetic research of 18 mongoose species revealed that the solitary and social mongooses form different clades. 
The phylogenetic relationships of Herpestidae are shown in the following cladogram:

Extinct species 
Atilax 

 †A. mesotes 

Herpestes 

 †H. lemanensis 

Leptoplesictis 

 †L. atavus Beaumont, 1973
 †L. aurelianensis Schlosser, 1888
 †L. filholi Gaillard, 1899
 †L. mbitensis Schmidt-Kittler, 1987
 †L. namibiensis Morales et al., 2008
 †L. peignei, Grohé et al., 2020
 †L. rangwai Schmidt-Kittler, 1987
 †L. senutae Morales et al., 2008

Behaviour and ecology
Mongooses mostly feed on insects, crabs, earthworms, lizards, birds, and rodents. However, they also eat eggs and carrion.

Some species can learn simple tricks. They can be tamed and are kept as pets to control vermin.

Cultural significance
In ancient Mesopotamia, mongooses were sacred to the deity Ninkilim, who was conflated with Ningirama, a deity of magic who was invoked for protection against serpents. According to a Babylonian popular saying, when a mouse fled from a mongoose into a serpent's hole, it announced, "I bring you greetings from the snake-charmer!" A creature resembling a mongoose also appears in Old Babylonian glyptic art, but its significance is not known.

All mongoose species, except for Suricata suricatta, are classed as a "prohibited new organism" under New Zealand's Hazardous Substances and New Organisms Act 1996, preventing them from being imported into the country.

A well-known fictional mongoose is Rikki-Tikki-Tavi, who appears in a short story of the same title in The Jungle Book (1894) by Rudyard Kipling. In this tale set in India, a young pet mongoose saves his human family from a krait and from Nag and Nagaina, two cobras. The story was later made into several films and a song by Donovan, among other references. A mongoose is also featured in Bram Stoker's novel The Lair of the White Worm. The main character, Adam Salton, purchases one to independently hunt snakes. Another mongoose features in the denouement of the Sherlock Holmes story "The Adventure of the Crooked Man", by Sir Arthur Conan Doyle. The Indian Tamil devotional film Padai Veetu Amman shows Tamil actor Vinu Chakravarthy changing himself into a mongoose by using his evil tantric mantra, to fight the goddess Amman.  However, the mongoose finally dies at the hands of the goddess.

Mongoose species are prohibited to be kept as pets in the United States.

See also
List of herpestids

References

Further reading

External links

 

 
Extant Oligocene first appearances
Mammals of Africa
Mammals of Asia
Marathi terms
Taxa named by Charles Lucien Bonaparte